Wuwei may refer to:

Philosophy
Wu wei, Chinese philosophical concept from Confucianism and an important concept in Chinese statecraft and Taoism

Places
Wuwei, Gansu, prefecture-level city
Wuwei, Anhui, Wuhu, Anhui

People
Wuwei Chanyu, chanyu of the Xiongnu empire
Princess Wuwei, also known as Princess Tuoba, daughter of Emperor Mingyuan of Northern Wei in ancient China
Princess Wuwei, daughter of Juqu Mujian and Princess Tuoba in ancient China

See also
Wu Wei (disambiguation)